Michael D. Greeder (May 1, 1957 – August 1, 2005) was an American professional ice hockey player who played in the American Hockey League (AHL), Central Hockey League (CHL), and International Hockey League (IHL). He was drafted by the Philadelphia Flyers in the eighth round of the 1977 NHL amateur draft. He played two years at the University of Minnesota, winning a national title in 1979. Greeder played seven professional seasons and was the captain of the Toledo Goaldiggers when they won the Turner Cup in 1982. He was a junior ice hockey coach following his playing career.

Career statistics

Awards and honors

References

External links

1957 births
2005 deaths
American men's ice hockey defensemen
Fort Worth Texans players
Ice hockey players from Minnesota
Indianapolis Checkers (CHL) players
Kalamazoo Wings (1974–2000) players
Maine Mariners players
Minnesota Golden Gophers men's ice hockey players
People from Mahtomedi, Minnesota
Philadelphia Flyers draft picks
Salt Lake Golden Eagles (CHL) players
Toledo Goaldiggers players
NCAA men's ice hockey national champions